The 2019–20 Arab Club Champions Cup knockout stage began on 20 August 2019 and ended on 21 August 2021 with the final at the Prince Moulay Abdellah Stadium in Rabat, Morocco, to decide the champions of the 2019–20 Arab Club Champions Cup. A total of 32 teams competed in the knockout stage.

Round and draw dates
The schedule is as follows. The tournament was postponed for ten months in 2020 due to the COVID-19 pandemic.

Format
Each tie in the knockout stage, apart from the final, is played over two legs, with each team playing one leg at home. The team that scores more goals on aggregate over the two legs advances to the next round. If the aggregate score is level, the away goals rule is applied, i.e. the team that scores more goals away from home over the two legs advances. If away goals are also equal, extra time will not be played and the winners are decided by a penalty shoot-out.

Qualified teams
The knockout stage involves 32 teams: the 30 teams which enter the competition from this stage, and the two teams which qualify from the preliminary round.

Teams were seeded based on their association rank in their respective region.

Bracket

First round

Summary

|}
Notes

Matches

Al-Quwa Al-Jawiya won 4–2 on aggregate.

Shabab Al-Ordon won 3–1 on aggregate.

FC Nouadhibou won 2–1 on aggregate.

Wydad Casablanca won 3–1 on aggregate.

Ismaily won 4–3 on aggregate.

Al-Jazira won 4–1 on aggregate.

Al-Wasl won 3–2 on aggregate.

Al-Ittihad Alexandria won 3–0 on aggregate.

Olympic Safi won 2–1 on aggregate.

Espérance de Tunis won 3–1 on aggregate.

MC Alger won 2–1 on aggregate.

3–3 on aggregate. Al-Shorta won on away goals. 

Raja Casablanca won 3–0 on aggregate.

Al-Shabab won 5–1 on aggregate.

3–3 on aggregate. Al-Muharraq won on away goals. 

Al-Ittihad Jeddah won 3–0 on aggregate.

Second round

Summary

|}

Matches

0–0 on aggregate. MC Alger won 4–2 on penalties.

Al-Ittihad Alexandria won 3–0 on aggregate.

Al-Shabab won 2–1 on aggregate.

5–5 on aggregate. Raja Casablanca won on away goals.

Al-Shorta won 6–0 on aggregate.

Ismaily won 4–0 on aggregate.

2–2 on aggregate. Olympic Safi won 4–2 on penalties.

Al-Ittihad Jeddah won 4–1 on aggregate.

Quarter-finals

Summary

|}

Matches

Al-Shabab won 7–0 on aggregate.

Al-Ittihad Jeddah won 2–1 on aggregate.

Ismaily won 1–0 on aggregate.

2–2 on aggregate. Raja Casablanca won on away goals.

Semi-finals

Summary

|}

Matches

Final

The final was played on 21 August 2021 at the Prince Moulay Abdellah Stadium in Rabat, Morocco. The "home" team (for administrative purposes) was determined by an additional draw held after the quarter-final and semi-final draws.

Top goalscorers

Notes

References

External links
UAFA Official website 

2019–20 Arab Club Champions Cup
2019–20 in African football
2020–21 in African football
2019 in Asian football
2020 in Asian football
2021 in Asian football